Anecito T. Pesante Sr. Memorial Hospital, Co. (abbreviated as APSMHC or simply Pesante Hospital) is now a 98-bed capacity tertiary PhilHealth accredited  private hospital located in Midsayap, Cotabato that caters the health needs of the people of PPALMA area.

Background
Anecito Trestiza Pesante, Sr., lived modestly with his family in the medium-sized town of Midsayap, Cotabato, then with a population of only 84,041. They run a family-owned sari-sari store that sells dry goods and manage a farm. The family had strong ties with the rural community; one that depended on land for livelihood. Farming wasn’t a particularly lucrative business, soothe people would purchase goods from then Pesante Store using barter system, during harvest season, the family acquired money in exchange for chickens and vegetables.

Janet Pesante recalls an instance of complaining to her father that it was too hot and they need to buy an electric fan, “you could live without a fan, but not without an education” her father whipped. Their father’s strong emphasis on the importance of education couldn’t be doubted for he have sent his children to private schools despite of tremendous financial challenge that paid big dividends.

In 1985, Evelyn Pesante, the second child completed her medical school and opened a small clinic in their house in November 1986. A few months later, due to the high demand for hospital services and the increase number of patients, the clinic was moved to a bigger and more strategic location in the public market area. She called her new place as Holy Family Medical Clinic, named after her college dormitory and the street of the former subdivision she lived in. The clinic catered mostly for consultations, as there were only five midwives. Meanwhile, Mr. Pesante Sr., with his background in running a business, was in-charge in the records and accounting section of the clinic. It has only five beds, later upgraded to eight beds available for patients who needed to be admitted.

Dr. Evelyn Pesante, who understood the importance of education as much as her father did, worked hard to help send her siblings to school. Eventually, Mr. Pesante Sr. became ill with cancer, the sickness that took his life in 1989. As he lay on his deathbed, he called each of his children to his bedside to leave his last request and wish. Once completed, he was at peace to die.

In 1995, a huge destructive fire in the public market site affected the operation of the clinic. At the same year, Ramon Pesante, the third child, finished his medical school. He trained at Cotabato Regional and Medical Center, where he specialized in surgery. With the combined efforts of Dr. Evelyn Pesante and Dr. Ramon Pesante, they henceforth moved back to their house, in which they developed to establish the Pesante Surgical and Medical Emergency Clinic. It has a laboratory, an emergency room, an operation room, a delivery room and a capacity of fifteen to twenty beds, but it had remained a clinic that was only for admissions, consultations, and out-patients at that time.

In the year 2000, due to the Department of Health’s stringent requirements, the clinic did not get the permission to upgrade to a primary hospital. This was also the time when Dr. Ramon Pesante started to settle with his own family; he put up his own clinic where he performs minor surgical procedures. Hence, Dr. Evelyn Pesante also had her own humble clinic that could attend patients for observation for at least twenty-four hours; after this they referred to higher hospitals when necessary.

The three youngest children, Alex, Janet, and Ron Pesante all became Registered Nurses and moved to the United States. On one of their vacation to their hometown, the family gathered and talk about the idea of construction of the hospital that their late father wished for on his deathbed. Since, for a family of medical professionals, it only made sense they couldn’t have been better way for them to serve their community. This was when they started planting the seed that would grow to be the Anecito T. Pesante, Sr. Memorial Hospital, Co. that stands today.

The three children abroad, worked hard to fund the hospital. In December 2005, marks the start of construction with the demolition of the family’s ancestral house building. The original plan was to build only two-storey hospital, but they trashed this and went on to build a four-storey hospital, having realized the need for a bigger hospital in PPALMA area that would serve more people. This idea was especially fuelled when the floor plan for the hospital was finally approved by the Department of Health in Manila.

The construction took a short hiatus due to financial constrains, but roughly after three years, the first three storeys were finished, opening to the public on May 8, 2008 with hospital instruments and equipments came on the way from the States.

See also
 List of hospitals in Philippines

References

Hospitals in the Philippines
Buildings and structures in Cotabato